Patrick Travers  (28 May 1883 – 5 February 1962) was a Scottish football player and manager in the first half of the 20th century. He played for many clubs in his native Scotland and for Barnsley in England, before becoming involved in coaching, and later, management, winning the Scottish Cup with Clyde on two occasions either side of World War II.

Playing career
Raised in Renfrew, Travers first played for his hometown team Renfrew Victoria around the turn of the century. In 1901 he played 13 games for Barnsley, before returning to Scotland to play for Thornliebank. He had a further spell at Barnsley, then went back to Thornliebank, followed by games for New Brompton and Renton before moving to Clyde.

In 1910, Travers was signed by Jimmy Philip to play for Aberdeen, but only played one season for them before returning to Glasgow, where he had business interests, to play for Celtic. He had one season with the Bhoys, playing regularly after coming in for the injured Jimmy McMenemy until he himself was injured and Patsy Gallacher took the place, resulting in him missing out on the latter stages of the 1911–12 Scottish Cup as the club won the competition. He then returned to Aberdeen, and this time stayed until the end of the 1913–14 season when he moved on to Dumbarton. He spent the remainder of his playing career in the West Dunbartonshire area, also playing for Clydebank, Vale of Leven and Dumbarton Harp.

Managerial career

Aberdeen
Travers coached in Norway and was trainer then player-manager of Dumbarton before being engaged to coach Aberdeen in 1922. He remained in that position until the retirement of Philip in the summer of 1924. One of his first acts as manager was the signing of Alec Jackson, together with his brother George. Jackson went on to be one of the most renowned players of his generation. In spite of this, however, Travers' first season in charge ended with relegation only avoided on goal difference. In the following seasons, many players came and went – Travers worked hard in the transfer market of the time, and his dealings are credited with improving the club's previously precarious financial situation.

In 1931, Travers mysteriously dropped three of the club's regular players before a match against Falkirk. In all, five players never played for the club again, and it was reported in the 1970s that this was the result of an alleged plot to win fixed-odds bets on half-time and full-time scores. No police action was ever taken, and many of those involved protested their innocence for the remainder of their lives. The same year, he brought Donald Colman to the club from Dumbarton to act as a coach.

In 1937, Travers took his team to the Scottish Cup final, the first time Aberdeen had ever appeared in the event. They were defeated 2–1 by Celtic in front of a record official attendance of 146,433, although many more spectators may have gained illegal entry. That summer, the club were on a tour of South Africa when outside-right Jackie Benyon died suddenly of peritonitis. Travers remained in charge for two more seasons, but feeling that he no longer had the full support of his directors, accepted an offer to manage Clyde in 1938; he was replaced at Aberdeen by Colman.

Clyde
The success which had eluded him at Pittodrie soon materialised at Shawfield, however, and the Scottish Cup was won by Travers' Clyde team in 1938–39. He was still manager of Clyde in 1954–55, when the Bully Wee beat Celtic in a replay to win their second Cup. He was also a runner up as manager with Clyde in the Scottish Cup in 1948–49 when Clyde lost 4–1 to Rangers in the final.

Also notably in season 1951–52, Travers led Clyde to four trophies in a single season; the Scottish Division B league title, the B Division Supplementary Cup, the Glasgow Cup and the Glasgow Merchants Charity Cup.

His four Scottish Cup finals earned him a reputation as a "Cup specialist" when named as one of Scotland's 50 greatest managers by the Sunday Herald newspaper.

Honours

Player 

Thornliebank
 Renfrewshire Victoria Cup: 1902–03, 1903–04

Renton
 Dumbartonshire Cup: 1907–08

Aberdeen
Scottish Division One: Runners-up 1910–11
 North East Cup: 1913–14

Celtic
Scottish Cup: 1911–12
Scottish Division One: Runners-up 1911–12

Dumbarton
 Dumbartonshire Cup: 1914–15
 Dumbartonshire Charity Cup: 1916–17

 Clydebank 

 Dunbartonshire Cup: 1917–18
 Clydebank Charity Cup: 1917–18

Manager
Dumbarton
 Dumbartonshire Cup: 1921–22
 Dumbartonshire Charity Cup: 1921–22

Aberdeen
 Scottish Cup: Runner-up: 1936–37
 Aberdeenshire Cup (10) : 1924–25, 1925–26, 1926–27, 1927–28, 1928–29, 1929–30, 1930–31, 1931–32, 1932–33, 1933–34
 Aberdeenshire League (4): 1925–26, 1926–27, 1927–28, 1928–29
 Dewar Shield (8): 1926–27, 1928–29, 1930–31, 1931–32, 1932–33, 1933–34, 1935–36, 1936–37

Clyde
 Scottish Cup: 1938–39, 1954–55
Runner-up: 1948–49
 Scottish B Division: 1951–52
 Supplementary Cup: 1951–52
 Glasgow Cup: 1946–47, 1951–52
 Glasgow Charity Cup: 1939–40, 1951–52
 Paisley Charity Cup: 1938–39, 1939–40

Managerial statistics

Sources
 
 Since 1881: the searchable Premiership and Football League player database

References

1883 births
1962 deaths
Scottish footballers
People from Renfrew
Footballers from North Ayrshire
Footballers from Renfrewshire
Clydebank F.C. (1914) players
Thornliebank F.C. players
Gillingham F.C. players
Renton F.C. players
Clyde F.C. players
Aberdeen F.C. players
Celtic F.C. players
Dumbarton F.C. players
Vale of Leven F.C. players
Dumbarton Harp F.C. players
Scottish football managers
Dumbarton F.C. managers
Aberdeen F.C. managers
Clyde F.C. managers
Scottish Football League managers
Scottish Football League players
English Football League players
Southern Football League players
Scottish Junior Football Association players
Association football inside forwards
Renfrew Victoria F.C. players
People from Beith